Seyva is a rural locality (a settlement) and the administrative center of Seyvinskoye Rural Settlement, Gaynsky District, Perm Krai, Russia. The population was 677 as of 2010. There are 6 streets.

Geography 
Seyva is located 46 km southwest of Gayny (the district's administrative centre) by road. Pugvin Mys is the nearest rural locality.

References 

Rural localities in Gaynsky District